PicMaster is a bitmap graphics editor which is distributed as shareware. The software combines several fields of application and therefore is also referred to as a multi talented image editor. One can not only find the standard image editing functions (draw with pen, remove red eye, add text, etc.) but also extended functions such as displaying anaglyph images, morphing and an integrated webcam support.

An anaglyph image can be constructed by shooting two slightly displaced pictures with a digital camera. An illusion of a three-dimensional picture is created by using the software and a pair of 3D glasses. Objects seem to emerge from the computer monitor.

The morphing function can transform photos from one person to another. To do so, the persons must be photographed in similar postures and their shapes need to be cut out with the help of the software. After doing so, points of support are set on noticeable spots (eyes, nose, mouth, etc.). Finally, the software calculates the intermediate images and creates a video of the transformation.

PicMaster supports multiple possibilities for capturing images from a camera. The image can be placed into the Internet by uploading them on a server with the FTP protocol. Alternatively, the software can turn the computer into a web server using the HTTP protocol. The system can also be run as an alarm system which sends an E-mail containing the image as soon as a movement is detected.

The software already includes 300 filter effects which can be described by using mathematical formulas. The integrated formula editor and parser allows a quick creation of image effects (e.g. r=r+20 increases the red portion of the image). Photoshop Plugins can be included as well. More Plugins are available in the Internet.

A large image containing many small images (frames) can be created with the mosaic function. From a set of frames, the software can choose the one that fits best the spot in the large image. When viewed from a distance, the frames convert to the large image.

The software offers several helpful functions for scanning pictures. Multiple pictures can be put on a scanner and by pressing a button they will be automatically:

 separated into frames
 straightened
 removed from the background border
 saved without any dialog (scan & save)
 photocopied (scan & print)

All working steps can be recorded in a macro and replayed later in order to reduce the amount of work. The actions are saved in a simple text file that can be run on multiple pictures at a later time. This makes it possible to shrink all pictures in a folder without the need to process each one individually.

Other functions include:
 Creation of slideshows with transition effects and voice comments. (as a runnable CD, screen saver, website, background switcher)
 Image viewer (thumbnail preview)
 Digital camera (copy pictures, renumber files, correct pixel errors)
 Creation of photographic albums
 Taking screenshots
 Video filters

External links 
 

Raster graphics editors